Donji grad (locally also , "Lower Town") is one of the 17 city districts of Zagreb, the capital of Croatia. It is located in the central part of the city and has 37,024 inhabitants (as of 2011). The official name of the district is rarely used, for it is dubbed centar (center) by most Zagreb residents even though "centar" encompasses some southern parts of district Gornji Grad-Medveščak.

Gallery

References

External links

List of streets and squares within Donji grad at Zagreb.hr 

Districts of Zagreb